The Turbay T-3A was an Argentine twin-engined seven-seater light transport of the 1960s. A single example was built, but no production followed.

Development and design
In 1957, the Argentine aircraft designer Alfredo Turbay began work on a twin-engined STOL light transport, the Turbay T-3A, with Turbay S.A. formed at Buenos Aires in January 1961 to build the new design. The T-3A was a low-wing cantilever monoplane of all metal construction. It was powered by two  Lycoming O-360-A1D air-cooled four-cylinder horizontally-opposed engines driving two-bladed propellers, and was fitted with a retractable nosewheel undercarriage.

Alfredo Turbay piloted the T-3A on its first flight on 8 December 1964.  Production was planned of the T-3B, which was to be fitted with  Lycoming or Continental engines, giving improved performance. These plans did not come to fruition, with the prototype T-3B never completed, and no production occurring.

Specifications

See also
 Turbay T-1 Tucán
 IMPA Tu-Sa

References

External links

 TURBAY T-3A
 ALFREDO TURBAY

1960s Argentine civil utility aircraft
1960s Argentine experimental aircraft
STOL aircraft
Low-wing aircraft
Twin piston-engined tractor aircraft